Lobularia is the scientific name of several genera of organisms and may refer to:

Lobularia (coral), a genus of corals in the family Alcyoniidae
Lobularia (fungus) Velen. 1934, a genus of fungi in the order Helotiales
Lobularia (plant) Desv. 1815, a genus of plants in the family Brassicaceae